Oreorchis is a genus of flowering plants from the orchid family, Orchidaceae. It is native to Asia. Species currently accepted as of June 2014:

Oreorchis angustata L.O.Williams ex N.Pearce & P.J.Cribb - Sichuan, Yunnan
Oreorchis aurantiaca P.J.Cribb & N.Pearce - Myanmar
Oreorchis bilamellata Fukuy. - Taiwan
Oreorchis discigera W.W.Sm.  - Myanmar
Oreorchis erythrochrysea Hand.-Mazz. - Tibet, Sichuan, Yunnan
Oreorchis fargesii Finet - Fujian, Gansu, Hubei, Hunan, Shaanxi, Sichuan, Taiwan, Yunnan, Zhejiang
Oreorchis foliosa (Lindl.) Lindl. - India, Assam, Nepal, Bhutan, Myanmar, Tibet, Sichuan, Taiwan, Yunnan 
Oreorchis itoana (F.Maek.) Perner - Honshu
Oreorchis micrantha Lindl. - Tibet, Taiwan, Assam, India, Bhutan, Nepal, Myanmar 
Oreorchis nana Schltr. - Sichuan, Yunnan, Hubei
Oreorchis nepalensis N.Pearce & P.J.Cribb - Nepal, Tibet
Oreorchis oligantha Schltr. - Gansu, Sichuan, Tibet, Yunnan
Oreorchis parvula Schltr. - Sichuan, Yunnan
Oreorchis patens (Lindl.) Lindl. - Japan, Korea, Russian Far East (Kamchatka, Primorye, Sakhalin, Kuril Islands), China (Gansu, Guizhou, Heilongjiang, Henan, Hunan, Jiangxi, Jilin, Liaoning, Sichuan, Taiwan, Yunnan)
Oreorchis porphyranthes Tuyama - Nepal
Oreorchis sanguinea (N.Pearce & P.J.Cribb) N.Pearce & P.J.Cribb - Bhutan

See also 
 List of Orchidaceae genera

References 

 Pridgeon, A.M., Cribb, P.J., Chase, M.A. & Rasmussen, F. eds. (1999). Genera Orchidacearum 1. Oxford Univ. Press.
 Pridgeon, A.M., Cribb, P.J., Chase, M.A. & Rasmussen, F. eds. (2001). Genera Orchidacearum 2. Oxford Univ. Press.
 Pridgeon, A.M., Cribb, P.J., Chase, M.A. & Rasmussen, F. eds. (2003). Genera Orchidacearum 3. Oxford Univ. Press
 Berg Pana, H. 2005. Handbuch der Orchideen-Namen. Dictionary of Orchid Names. Dizionario dei nomi delle orchidee. Ulmer, Stuttgart

External links 

Orchids of Asia
Calypsoinae
Calypsoinae genera